Q41 may refer to:

 Q41 (New York City bus)
 Al-Rahmani, a corvette of the Royal Navy of Oman
 Fussilat, the 41st surah of the Quran